The Hebron Town Hall is located in Hebron, Wisconsin.

History
The building served as the town hall until 1981. It has also served as a polling station during elections and has hosted events including plays, dances and art exhibitions. Currently, it serves as a museum operated by the Black River Woods Historical Society. It was added to the State and the National Register of Historic Places in 2002.

References

City and town halls on the National Register of Historic Places in Wisconsin
National Register of Historic Places in Jefferson County, Wisconsin
Historical society museums in Wisconsin
Museums in Jefferson County, Wisconsin
Auditoriums in the United States
Tourist attractions in Jefferson County, Wisconsin
Neoclassical architecture in Wisconsin
Government buildings completed in 1902